The 1977 E3 Harelbeke was the 20th edition of the E3 Harelbeke cycle race and was held on 26 March 1977. The race started and finished in Harelbeke. The race was won by Dietrich Thurau.

General classification

References

1977 in Belgian sport
1977
1977 in road cycling